WPC/DC Annie Cartwright is a fictional character in BBC One's  science fiction/police procedural drama, Life on Mars. The character is portrayed by Liz White. In the American version the character's surname is changed to 'Norris' and she is portrayed by Gretchen Mol.

Character history

During the first series of Life on Mars, the character was a Woman Police Constable serving in uniform. Early in the second series, DCI Gene Hunt allows her to join CID as Woman Detective Constable. Throughout both series, Cartwright helps the programme's protagonist, Sam Tyler adjust to life in the 1970s. A degree of attraction is displayed between the two characters, lending a distinct sexual tension. Cartwright is the only person in 1973 who Sam tells that he has travelled back in time, and she treats him sympathetically, believing that he is suffering from severe concussion after being hit by a car. During the first episode of series one, when Sam climbs onto the police station roof, considering suicide, Cartwright convinces him not to jump.

Upon Sam first losing consciousness after the car accident which sent him back in time, he sees a fleeting image of a woman in a red dress running away from an attacker. The image is later revealed to be a childhood memory of Annie chasing after Sam's father, and being attacked by him.

No references are made to Annie's family in either the first or second series, apart from a mention of an unnamed nephew in "The Crash", which indicates that she has a brother or sister.

Before the final episodes of Ashes to Ashes, the reason for her absence and whereabouts have never been stated. During the course of Ashes to Ashes, it is revealed that Sam and Annie married and were described as the "happiest couple ever seen" and had no children. In the finale, Keats mentions that there is no trace of Annie anywhere but it is revealed in the final episode that Gene Hunt, who helps souls of the police force pass on, ultimately helped both Sam and Annie move on, implying that Annie too was a police officer either killed or critically injured in the real world. Some fans believe she was most likely beaten to death by Vic Tyler as witnessed by a young Sam Tyler, however this notion creates continuity issues as she is "alive" in the series after the attack by Vic Tyler. This attack also takes place after her actual death prior to being assisted to move on by Gene Hunt.

American character

In the US remake, Annie Norris (Gretchen Mol) is a uniformed policewoman with an undergraduate psychology education who has aspirations of making the detective squad. Norris constantly struggles against sexist attitudes about the role of a woman in police work. Owing to her gender, her nickname among the detectives is "No Nuts Norris". She is the only one on the force to whom Sam has revealed that he is from the future – although she does not seem to believe him, she is the most sympathetic of his colleagues; she puts more faith in his claim after a prophecy from Sam saves her life from Vic Tyler in the counterpart episode to the BBC's first series finale.

She is promoted to detective in the finale.

References

External links
 Annie Cartwright (Life on Mars)
 Annie Cartwright (Internet Movie Database)

Fictional British police detectives
Fictional New York City Police Department detectives
Fictional people from Manchester
Life on Mars (TV series) characters
Television characters introduced in 2006
Fordham University alumni